The Ministry of Macedonia and Thrace is a former ministry of Greece. Responsible for the regions of Macedonia and Thrace, since 2015 it has been demoted to the level of a sub-ministry within the Ministry of the Interior.

The ministry had been known as the Ministry of Northern Greece until it was renamed on 19 August 1988. It was demoted to a general secretariat in 2009, but was re-established as a ministry in 2012, and again demoted to a sub-ministry within the Ministry of the Interior on 27 January 2015. It is housed in Government House in Thessaloniki.

History
The ministry was founded in 1912 as the Governorate-General of Macedonia following the acquisition of Macedonia during the Balkan Wars. It was promoted to cabinet level in the late 1920s and renamed the Governorate-General of Northern Greece in 1945, after being merged with the Governorate-General of Thrace.

It was renamed the Ministry of Northern Greece in 1955. The third name change occurred in 1988, when it was renamed the Ministry of Macedonia and Thrace. In 2009, the ministry was downgraded to a General Secretariat within the Ministry of the Interior, until it was re-established as a separate ministry in 2012. With the legislative election of SYRIZA in January 2015, the ministry was once more subordinated to the Ministry of the Interior and Administrative Reconstruction, headed by a deputy minister.

Shortly after the Hellenic Army entered Thessaloniki on 26 October 1912, King Constantine I demanded that he be given control of the newly acquired region of Macedonia, but Prime Minister Eleftherios Venizelos had already decided that the fate of the region would lie with his Minister of Justice, Konstantinos Raktivan, who arrived in the city on 30 October. His position within the Governorate-General of Macedonia was so powerful that his power matched that of the Prime Minister and caused dismay among the other ministers in Athens. Raktivan was later succeeded by other prominent politicians of Greece, such as Stefanos Dragoumis, Emmanouil Repoulis and Themistoklis Sofoulis.

Despite its limited freedom of action in later years, the Governorate-General of Macedonia managed to produce an astonishing amount of work between its founding in 1912 and the creation of the Ministry of Northern Greece in 1955. Following the Great Thessaloniki Fire of 1917, the Governorate-General appointed Ernest Hébrard as the master architect for the redesign of the city. The Governorate-General was also responsible for the complete incorporation of Macedonia into the Greek state despite the difficult circumstances of the interwar period. Other successes of the Governorate-General at the time include the establishment of numerous government agencies, including the creation of Courts of Appeal, Courts of First Instance and District Courts, the creation of an independent archaeological department, a forestry department and public services, and the provision of shelter to hundreds of thousands of refugees after the population exchange between Greece and Turkey in the 1920s.

The Ministry

Structure
According to Presidential Decree no. 167 (2 September 2005), the Ministry of Macedonia and Thrace was made up of the following departments:

The Ministry of Macedonia and Thrace
The Office of Solicitor of the State
The Office of Financial Control
The Office of the Borderland
The Office of the Assessor of the Audit Office
The Office of the Deputy Minister
The Office of Defence and Political Planning in Case of Emergency
The Office of Public Relations, of the Press and of Etiquette
The Office of the Secretary-General
The Secretariat
The Office of Foreign Affairs, Defence, Policing and Justice
Department of Cooperation with the countries of south-eastern Europe
Department of European Affairs
Department of the Diaspora
Department of Defence and the Aegean
Department of Policing and Justice
The Office of Education, Culture and Citizen Protection
The Office of the Economy and Tourism
The Office of Infrastructure and the Environment
The Office of Administrative Development and e-Governance
The Office of the Media
The Office of Quality and Efficiency
The Office of Facilitation of People with Disabilities
The Department of Inspection and Coordination of Services

Political leadership

Since the Metapolitefsi, there have been twenty Ministers for Macedonia and Thrace from two parties, New Democracy and PASOK. The first to assume the post following the fall of the military junta in 1974 was Nikolaos Martis. Stavros Kalafatis served as the last minister before the ministry's abolition upon the election of George Papandreou in 2009.

The ministry was re-established on 21 June 2012 after the election of Antonis Samaras, but was again absorbed by the Ministry of the Interior on 27 January 2015 after the election of Alexis Tsipras.

Role
The Ministry of Macedonia and Thrace is responsible for "the development of the border regions of Greece, giving Northern Greece the opportunity to acquire a voice and role in the political and economic processes". In particular, the ministry gathers information regarding the communities that fall under its jurisdiction and proceeds to propose and discuss legislation and policies with other government bodies.

References

Macedonia (Greece)
Western Thrace
Government agencies established in 1912
1912 establishments in Greece